KVES may refer to:

 KVES-LD, a low-power television station (channel 36) licensed to serve Palm Springs, California, United States
 Darke County Airport (ICAO code KVES)